XL1 is the second solo album by Buzzcocks frontman Pete Shelley. It reached number 42 in the UK Albums Chart, remaining in that listing for four weeks. The single "Telephone Operator" charted at No. 66 in the UK Singles Chart, making it his biggest single release there. The original release was packaged with a computer program for the ZX Spectrum which displayed lyrics and graphics in time with the music.

XL1 had a different running order in the US and contained an edited version of "Many a Time". The original UK album was reissued on CD by Grapevine in 1999 and by Western Songs in 2006, both including two B-side "dub" mixes as bonus tracks.

Track listing
All tracks composed by Pete Shelley.

UK version
Side one
 "Telephone Operator" – 3:14
 "If You Ask Me (I Won't Say No)" – 4:20
 "What Was Heaven?" – 5:04
 "You Know Better Than I Know" – 5:04
 "Twilight" – 3:08

Side two
 "(Millions of People) No One Like You" – 4:07
 "Many a Time" – 6:41
 "I Just Wanna Touch" – 3:04
 "You & I" – 3:00
 "XL1" – 3:27
 Z X Spectrum Code

1999/2006 CD bonus tracks
 "Telephone Operator/Many a Time (Dub)" – 13:13
 "If You Ask Me/No One Like You (Dub)" – 5:46

UK XL1 + Dub Mix Album cassette
Side one
 "Telephone Operator" – 3:14
 "If You Ask Me (I Won't Say No)" – 4:20
 "What Was Heaven?" – 5:04
 "You Know Better Than I Know" – 5:04
 "Twilight" – 3:08
 "(Millions of People) No One Like You" – 4:07
 "Many a Time" – 6:41
 "I Just Wanna Touch" – 3:04
 "You and I" – 3:00
 "XL1" – 3:27

Side two (dub mixes)
 "Homosapien (Dub)"
 "I Don't Know What It Is / Witness The Change (Dub)"
 "Telephone Operator / Many a Time (Dub)"
 "If You Ask Me (I Won't Say No) / No One Like You (Dub)"
 Z X Spectrum Code

US version
Side one
 "Telephone Operator" – 3:15
 "Many a Time" – 4:18
 "I Just Wanna Touch" – 2:54
 "You Know Better Than I Know" – 4:48
 "XL1" – 3:25

Side two
 "(Millions of People) No One Like You" – 4:05
 "If You Ask Me (I Won't Say No)" – 4:20
 "You and I" – 3:01
 "What Was Heaven?" – 5:05
 "Twilight" – 3:12

Personnel
Musicians
Pete Shelley
Barry Adamson
Jim Russell
Martin Rushent

Technical
Martin Rushent – co-producer
Pete Shelley – co-producer
Joey – computer visuals
Mike Prior – photography
Bruno Tilley – cover

Charts

References

1983 albums
Albums produced by Martin Rushent
Island Records albums
Pete Shelley albums
Vinyl data